Jonathan Eysseric and Nicolas Renavand were the defending champions, but chose not to compete.

Tristan Lamasine and Laurent Lokoli won the title, defeating Guillermo Durán and Máximo González in the final, 7–5, 6–0.

Seeds

  Guillermo Durán /  Máximo González (final)
  Ruben Gonzales /  Roberto Maytín (quarterfinals)
  Jordan Kerr /  Fabrice Martin (Quarterfianls)
  José Hernández /  Andrés Molteni (first round)

Draw

Draw

References
 Main Draw

Internationaux de Tennis de Blois
2014 Doubles